Desolation Canyon is a remote canyon on the Green River in eastern Utah, United States that is listed on the National Register of Historic Places (NRHP). It is said to be one of the most remote areas in the contiguous United States.

Description
The canyon begins in southwestern Uintah County and then meanders roughly south along (and becomes) the county line between Uintah and Carbon counties (including the entire eastern border of Carbon County). Continuing its southerly meander, it then becomes the county line between Emery and Grand counties, until it reaches its mouth in the Roan Cliffs. (The Green River continues flowing south through Gray Canyon.) Desolation Canyon is situated between the West Tavaputs Plateau on the west and the East Tavaputs Plateau on the east. At its deepest point, a relief of over  exists from river level to the unseen rim of the Tavaputs Plateau.

History
Over the last few thousand years, different groups of humans have occupied the area and left their traces behind. Fremont and Ute pictographs and petroglyphs are abundant in Desolation Canyon and its numerous tributary canyons, such as Nine Mile and Range Creek. Fremont granaries, as well as several abandoned homesteaders' ranches, testify to the agricultural potential of riparian alluvial fans, which are larger in Desolation Canyon than in any other canyon of the Colorado - Green river system.

The canyon was traversed by John Wesley Powell in 1869 as part of an expedition that was sponsored by the Smithsonian Institution. Originally homesteaded by the Seamount family in 1914, Rock Creek Ranch is still used as a horse pasture by the ranches' contemporary owners, which makes it the last property in the canyon still commercially in use. Desolation Canyon was added to the NRHP and declared a National Historic Landmark in 1968 as part of the centennial celebration of the Powell expedition.

Recreation

Each year during the spring, summer, and fall months, many boaters make the  trip through Desolation and Gray canyons from Sand Wash to Swasey's Rapid, just upstream of the city of Green River. This section is managed by the Price office of the Bureau of Land Management, which issues permits. An additional permit must be obtained to camp or hike on the eastern side of the river, which is part of the Uintah and Ouray Indian Reservation for most of the canyon's length. As of spring 2015, the Utes are no longer offering permits to non-tribal members. Over 60 named class two and three rapids challenge boaters, and the gradual increase in size and difficulty of rapids make it an ideal place for beginner to intermediate boaters to develop their skills. At high water (over ), Joe Hutch Canyon Rapid (Cow Swim) approaches a class IV difficulty. Rapids in the canyon are big enough to swamp an open canoe at any water level.

See also

 List of canyons and gorges in Utah
 List of National Historic Landmarks in Utah
 National Register of Historic Places listings in Carbon County, Utah
 National Register of Historic Places listings in Emery County, Utah
 National Register of Historic Places listings in Grand County, Utah
 National Register of Historic Places listings in Uintah County, Utah

References

External links

 Desolation & Gray canyons river information on blm.gov
 Desolation Canyon River Access, Rapids and Points of Interest at RiverBrain

Canyons and gorges of Utah
Green River (Colorado River tributary)
Landforms of Carbon County, Utah
Landforms of Emery County, Utah
Canyons and gorges of Grand County, Utah
Landforms of Uintah County, Utah
National Historic Landmarks in Utah
Bureau of Land Management areas in Utah
Natural features on the National Register of Historic Places in Utah
Protected areas of Carbon County, Utah
Protected areas of Emery County, Utah
Protected areas of Grand County, Utah
Protected areas of Uintah County, Utah